Tumor necrosis factor ligand superfamily member 12 also known as TNF-related weak inducer of apoptosis (TWEAK) is a protein that in humans is encoded by the TNFSF12 gene.

Function 

TWEAK was discovered in 1997. The protein encoded by this gene is a cytokine that belongs to the tumor necrosis factor (TNF) ligand family. This protein is a ligand for the FN14/TWEAKR receptor. This cytokine has overlapping signaling functions with TNF, but displays a much wider tissue distribution. Leukocytes are the main source of TWEAK including human resting and activated monocytes, dendritic cells and natural killer cells. TWEAK can induce apoptosis via multiple pathways of cell death in a cell type-specific manner. This cytokine is also found to promote proliferation and migration of endothelial cells, and thus acts as a regulator of angiogenesis.

Clinical significance 

Excessive activation of the TWEAK pathway in chronic injury has been described to promote pathological tissue changes including chronic inflammation, fibrosis and angiogenesis. In chronic liver disease, for example, TWEAK expression is enhanced and causes hepatic stellate cells, which are key regulators of liver fibrosis, to proliferate.

References

Further reading